Ivo Pertile (born 12 August 1971) is an Italian former ski jumper who competed from 1986 to 1996.

Career
Pertile finished eighth in the team large hill and 31st in the individual normal hill events at the 1994 Winter Olympics in Lillehammer. His best finish at the Ski Jumping World Championships was 23rd in the normal hill event in Val di Fiemme in 1991. He also finished 17th at the 1994 Ski Flying World Championships in Planica. His best finish at World Cup level was fourth in a normal hill event in Val di Fiemme, Italy in 1990.

Further notable results
1990: 2nd, Italian championships of ski jumping
1991: 2nd, Italian championships of ski jumping
1992: 3rd, Italian championships of ski jumping
1993: 3rd, Italian championships of ski jumping
1994: 3rd, Italian championships of ski jumping
1995: 2nd, Italian championships of ski jumping

External links

1971 births
Living people
Sportspeople from Trentino
Italian male ski jumpers
Ski jumpers at the 1992 Winter Olympics
Ski jumpers at the 1994 Winter Olympics
Olympic ski jumpers of Italy